The discography of LaFee, a German pop rock singer, consists of six studio albums, 29 singles, one best-of album, one compilation album and three music DVDs.

Studio albums

Compilation albums

Singles

Music videos

Video albums

References

Discographies of German artists
Pop music discographies